The Strangerers is a British television comedy-drama science fiction series written by Rob Grant (best known as co-creator of Red Dwarf) and was broadcast on Sky One between 15 February and 11 April 2000.

A single series was made with a total of nine episodes (the first being one hour in length and the rest 30 minutes each). The show ended on a cliffhanger. It has not been released on DVD, nor repeated since its original run.

Plot
The story centres around two alien agents, Cadet Flynn and Pseudo-Cadet Niven. They are incredibly advanced and evolved vegetables on a fact finding mission to Earth, where they take on human form. Their supervisor is accidentally decapitated shortly after arrival, leaving the cadets to fend for themselves. Through the course of the series the aliens discover the intricacies of basic needs, like the eating ritual, the sleeping ritual and how to purchase things, usually doing so in their own idiosyncratic manner.

Their exact whereabouts on Earth is something of a mystery. The society in which they find themselves bears some resemblance to both Britain and America, and there are hints that a totalitarian government is in charge. There are also street gangs parodying those in A Clockwork Orange. Two agents and their apparently psychopathic commander try to capture the aliens. The aliens repeatedly escape, but not without suffering occasional injuries themselves.

Cast

Mark Williams as Cadet Flynn
Jack Docherty as Cadet Niven
Sarah Alexander as Rina
Mark Heap as Harry
Milton Jones as The Supervisor
Morwenna Banks as The Super-Supervisor
Paul Darrow as C.D.
David Walliams as Rats
John Sparkes as Bilbo
Doon Mackichan as Galdriel
Meera Syal as Volunteer
Kulvinder Ghir as Keith
Mike Hayley as Irius Mann

Episodes

See also
2000 in British television

External links
 
 

2000s British comic science fiction television series
2000 British television series debuts
2000 British television series endings
Television series about alien visitations
British science fiction television shows
Television shows shot at Elstree Film Studios
Sky sitcoms
2000s British comedy-drama television series